DL, dL, or dl may stand for:

In science and technology

In electronics and computing
, an HTML element used for a definition list
Deep learning, a branch of algorithm-based machine learning
Description logics, a family of knowledge representation languages
Delete Line (ANSI), an ANSI X3.64 escape sequence
Digital library, a library in which collections are stored in digital formats
Diode logic, a logic family using diodes
DVD-R DL, a DVD Dual Layer engineering method
DL register, the low byte of an X86 16-bit DX register
Dynamic loading, a mechanism for a computer program to load a library

In telecommunications
Data link, a computer connection for transmitting data
Distribution list, a function of e-mail clients
Downlink, the link from a satellite to a ground station
Download, a transfer of electronic data

Vehicles
Subaru DL, an automobile
Australian National DL class, a class of diesel locomotives built by Clyde Engineering
New Zealand DL class locomotive, a  diesel-electric class built by Dalian Locomotive and Rolling Stock Company
Destroyer leader, a large naval vessel capable of leading a flotilla

Other uses in science and technology
Dimensionless quantity (dl, in lower case), the 'per unit' system of measurement
Decilitre (or deciliter, dL), a unit of measurement of capacity or volume
Discrete logarithms, in mathematics
Distance learning, Internet-based education
HPE ProLiant DL, density line servers
Dextrorotation and levorotation or D/L nomenclature, used in naming chemical compounds

In arts and entertainment 
D.L. (play), a Bulgarian play
DL series, a series of adventures and some supplementary material for the Advanced Dungeons & Dragons role playing game
D. L. Hawkins, fictional character on the American television series Heroes
D. L. Hughley (born 1963), American actor and comedian
Directors Lounge, an ongoing Berlin-based film and media-art platform and/or its annual film festival
Dominant leittonwechselklänge

In business
Dai-ichi Life, an insurance company
Delta Air Lines (IATA airline code: DL)

Railroads
Delaware–Lackawanna Railroad in Pennsylvania, U.S.
District line, a London Underground line

Places
DL postcode area, Darlington, north-east England
County Donegal, Ireland
 Delanggu railway station, a railway station in Indonesia (station code)
Detroit Lakes, Minnesota, US

In politics
Democracy is Freedom – The Daisy, a former political party in Italy
Drinking Liberally, a social organization that discusses politics in bars
Liberal Democracy (France) (Démocratie Libérale), a former political party in France
Rights and Freedom, a political party in Italy

In sports
Defensive lineman, an American/Canadian football players position
Disabled list, the former name of the injured list, a list of injured baseball players
Duckworth–Lewis method, a mathematical way to calculate the target score in cricket
Deadlift, a powerlifting move
Detroit Lions, a football team in the NFL

Other uses
 Deputy Lieutenant, a British title
 Diaper lover, a fetish
 Dimension Lengthwise, an International standard size of an envelope (110mm × 220mm, holds ⅓ A4)
 Doctor of Letters, a university degree
 Down-low (disambiguation)
 Driver's license, an official document which states that a person may operate a motorized vehicle
 Number 550, in Roman numerals